Frénouville-Cagny is a train station located in Frénouville, Calvados, Normandy, France.

Location 
The station is at the border between Frénouville and Cagny, on the Mantes-la-Jolie to Cherbourg railway.

Service 
Frénouville-Cagny station is served by regular trains to Caen and to Lisieux, and once a day by a train to Évreux and to Cherbourg.

Bus Verts du Calvados line 116 also serves the station, with buses toward Mézidon and Caen.

References 

Railway stations in Calvados